The 1998 Generali Open was a men's tennis tournament played on Clay in Kitzbühel, Austria that was part of the International Series of the 1998 ATP Tour. It was the forty-third edition of the tournament and was held from 27 July – 2 August 1998.

Seeds
Champion seeds are indicated in bold text while text in italics indicates the round in which those seeds were eliminated.

Draw

Finals

Top half

Bottom half

References

Doubles
Austrian Open Kitzbühel